The 1997 Sydney International was a tennis tournament played on outdoor hard courts at the NSW Tennis Centre in Sydney in Australia that was part of the World Series of the 1997 ATP Tour and of Tier II of the 1997 WTA Tour. The tournament ran from 6 through 12 January 1997.

Finals

Men's singles

 Tim Henman defeated  Carlos Moyá 6–3, 6–1
 It was Henman's 1st title of the year and the 1st of his career.

Women's singles

 Martina Hingis defeated  Jennifer Capriati 6–1, 5–7, 6–1
 It was Hingis' 1st title of the year and the 6th of her career.

Men's doubles

 Luis Lobo /  Javier Sánchez defeated  Paul Haarhuis /  Jan Siemerink 6–4, 6–7, 6–3
 It was Lobo's 1st title of the year and the 6th of his career. It was Sánchez's 1st title of the year and the 25th of his career.

Women's doubles

 Gigi Fernández /  Arantxa Sánchez Vicario defeated  Lindsay Davenport /  Natasha Zvereva 6–3, 6–1
 It was Fernández's 1st title of the year and the 68th of her career. It was Sánchez Vicario's 1st title of the year and the 74th of her career.

External links
 Official website
 ATP tournament profile
 WTA tournament profile

 
Sydney International, 1997